Peter Edgar Bainbridge (born 30 January 1958) is an English former professional footballer who played as a defender in the Football League for York City and Darlington, in non-League football for Selby Town, Huby, Sheriff Hutton and Whitby Town, and was on the books of Middlesbrough and Hartlepool United without making a league appearance.

References

1958 births
Living people
People from Newton-on-Ouse
Footballers from Yorkshire
English footballers
Association football defenders
Middlesbrough F.C. players
Selby Town F.C. players
Hartlepool United F.C. players
York City F.C. players
Darlington F.C. players
Whitby Town F.C. players
English Football League players